Major General Leslie Arthur Pearce  (22 January 1918 – 21 December 2002) was a senior commander in the New Zealand Army. He served as Chief of the General Staff, the professional head of the New Zealand Army, from 1971 to 1973, when he retired. He was the first soldier in the New Zealand Army who rose from private to Chief of Army.

Early life
Pearce was born on 22 January 1918 in the Auckland suburb of Herne Bay. His parents were Bessie (1879–1940) and Frank Pearce (1874–1956). Both from Bristol in England, his parent had married on 4 August 1904 at the Wesleyan Church in New Plymouth.

On 3 July 1944, Pearce married Fay Mattocks of Balmoral at St Barnabas' Church in Mount Eden. They were to have two sons and one daughter.

Army career
Pearce joined the army in 1937 as a private. He served in the Second World War, leaving in 1940. He was with the infantry in Egypt, Italy, and North Africa. By the final year of the war, he was a major and commander of the 26th Battalion. After the war he remaining in the military, performing instructing duties.

Pearce was in Malaya as a lieutenant colonel from 1960 to 1964 following the Malayan Emergency, during which time he was commander of the  1st Infantry Battalion, Royal New Zealand Infantry Regiment. He also served in the Vietnam War as a brigadier. In 1967, Pearce attended the Imperial Defence College in London. He was promoted to Chief of the General Staff in 1971 and held the post for two years, after which he retired. He was the first soldier in the New Zealand Army who rose from private to Chief of Army.

Rugby union
In his youth, Pearce played rugby union as a flanker. He was elected president of the Auckland Rugby Union in 1975 and held that role until 1977. Afterwards, he was the chairman of a select committee of the New Zealand Rugby Union. He was vice patron of North Harbour Rugby Union from 1985 to 1988, and became the club's patron in 1988. He held that role until his death. In 2004, the club introduced the "Major-General Les Pearce Memorial Shield", which is the Premier 1 grade challenge shield.

Honours and commemoration
In the 1956 New Year Honours, Pearce was appointed Member of the Order of the British Empire in the military division. In the 1964 New Year Honours, he was promoted to Officer of the same order. In the 1972 New Year Honours, he was promoted to Commander of the same order. In the 1973 Birthday Honours, he was appointed Companion of the Order of the Bath.

Death
Pearce died in Auckland on 21 December 2002. His funeral was held at St Peter's Anglican Church in Takapuna.

In 2021, a former soldier who used to serve under Pearce saw his military memorabilia put up for auction. He informed staff at the National Army Museum in Waiouru about the auction and they purchased the items for their collection.

References

1918 births
2002 deaths
New Zealand generals
New Zealand Companions of the Order of the Bath
New Zealand Commanders of the Order of the British Empire
New Zealand military personnel of World War II
New Zealand military personnel of the Malayan Emergency
New Zealand military personnel of the Vietnam War
New Zealand Rugby Football Union officials
People from Auckland
Graduates of the Royal College of Defence Studies